Fred Alan Jones (23 February 1927 – 14 August 2009) was an English-born Scottish first-class cricketer and schoolmaster.

Jones was born at Macclesfield, where he was educated at The King's School. From there, he went up to Balliol College, Oxford. While at Oxford, he made his debut in first-class cricket for Oxford University against Worcestershire at Oxford in 1951. Mentioned by The Times as one to watch at the start of both the 1951 and 1952 seasons, Jones was unable to establish himself and played just four first-class matches for Oxford. After graduating from Oxford, Jones became a schoolmaster. Starting in 1954, he began playing first-class cricket for Scotland, debuting against Derbyshire at Buxton. 1954 also saw Jones making his debut in minor counties cricket for Cheshire, an infrequent association he would maintain until 1960, with four appearances in the Minor Counties Championship. He played first-class cricket for Scotland until 1961, making eight appearances. 

He spent time in Pakistan during the first half of the 1960s, where he played first-class cricket for Hyderabad in the Quaid-e-Azam Trophy from 1962 to 1964, making four appearances. Jones played in a total of sixteen first-class matches, scoring 618 runs at an average of 19.93, with a high score of 88, which he made against the touring Indians in 1959.

He lived the remainder of his life in Scotland, where he died at Edinburgh in August 2009.

References

External links

1927 births
2009 deaths
Sportspeople from Macclesfield
Scottish people of English descent
People educated at The King's School, Macclesfield
Alumni of Balliol College, Oxford
Scottish cricketers
Oxford University cricketers
Cheshire cricketers
Hyderabad (Pakistan) cricketers
Scottish schoolteachers